Oleh Oleksandrovych Lutsenko (born 14 February 1993) is a Ukrainian professional footballer who plays as a defender for Rubikon Kyiv.

Lutsenko is а product of youth team system of FC Molod Poltava. Made his debut for FC Chornomorets in the game against FC Dynamo Kyiv on 4 April 2015 in the Ukrainian Premier League.

References

External links
 
 

1993 births
Living people
People from Lubny
Ukrainian footballers
Association football defenders
FC Shakhtar-3 Donetsk players
FC Chornomorets Odesa players
FC Hirnyk Kryvyi Rih players
FC Hirnyk-Sport Horishni Plavni players
FC Lokomotiv Yerevan players
FC Rubikon Kyiv players
FC Olimpik Donetsk players
FC Desna Chernihiv players
Ukrainian Premier League players
Ukrainian First League players
Ukrainian Second League players
Ukrainian expatriate footballers
Expatriate footballers in Georgia (country)
Ukrainian expatriate sportspeople in Georgia (country)
Expatriate footballers in Armenia
Ukrainian expatriate sportspeople in Armenia
Sportspeople from Poltava Oblast